Monte Caseros Airport  is an airport serving Monte Caseros, a town in the Corrientes Province of Argentina.

An asphalt parallel runway just west of the grass runway is marked closed.

The Monte Caseros VOR-DME (Ident: MCS) is located on the field.

See also

Transport in Argentina
List of airports in Argentina

References

External links
OpenStreetMap - Monte Caseros Airport

Airports in Argentina